The following lists events that happened during 1888 in the Kingdom of Belgium.

Incumbents
Monarch: Leopold II
Prime Minister: Auguste Marie François Beernaert

Events
 Belgian State Railways Type 12 taken into service.

 27 May – Provincial elections
 12 June – Partial legislative elections of 1888
 August – Preaching of Charles Lavigerie in Brussels Minster inspires the founding of the Belgian Anti-Slavery Society
 26-27 August – Polydore de Keyser, Lord Mayor of London, visits Dendermonde

Publications
Periodicals
 Het Laatste Nieuws begins publication

Studies
 Theodore Low De Vinne, Christopher Plantin, and the Plantin-Moretus Museum at Antwerp (Grolier Club, New York)

Literature
 J.-H. Rosny, Les Xipéhuz
 Émile Verhaeren, Les Soirs and Les Débâcles

Art and architecture

Paintings
 Robert Alott, Am Strand von Ostende
 Théo van Rysselberghe, Portrait of Alice Sethe

Opera
 Patrie! performed at Ghent (25 January) and Antwerp (6 March)

Births
 2 February – Valerius Coucke, biblical scholar (died 1951)
 19 February – Hector Tiberghien, cyclist (died 1951)
 29 February – Fanny Heldy, opera singer (died 1973)
 4 March – Charles Leirens, photographer and musician (died 1963)
 19 March – Léon Scieur, coureur cycliste (died 1969)
 23 May – Dieudonné Saive, small arms designer (died 1970)
 14 July – Odile Defraye, cyclist (died 1965)
 11 August – Paul Loicq, hockey administrator (died 1953)
 16 October – Émile Masson, cyclist (died 1973)
 2 December – Omer Verschoore, cyclist (died 1932)

Deaths
 8 January – Josephus Laurentius Dyckmans (born 1811), painter
 6 February – Gaston Errembault de Dudzeele (born 1819), diplomat
 17 July – Henricus Franciscus Bracq (born 1804), bishop of Ghent
 20 July – Henri de Braekeleer (born 1840), painter
 15 August – Alexandre Jamar (born 1821), businessman
 8 October – Jules d'Anethan (born 1803), politician

References

 
1880s in Belgium
Belgium
Years of the 19th century in Belgium
Belgium